What Am I Bid? is a 1919 American silent romance film directed by Robert Z. Leonard and starring Mae Murray, Ralph Graves and Willard Louis.

Cast
 Mae Murray as Betty Yarnell 
 Ralph Graves as Ralph McGibbon 
 Willard Louis as Abner Grimp 
 Dark Cloud as Dark Cloud 
 John Cook as John Yarnell
 Gertrude Astor as Diana Newlands 
 Joseph W. Girard as John McGibbon

References

Bibliography
 Michael G. Ankerich. Mae Murray: The Girl with the Bee-stung Lips. University Press of Kentucky, 2012.

External links
 

1919 films
1910s romance films
American silent feature films
American romance films
Films directed by Robert Z. Leonard
American black-and-white films
Universal Pictures films
1910s English-language films
1910s American films